"No Matter What" is a song from the 1996 musical Whistle Down the Wind that was popularised by Irish boyband Boyzone in 1998 when they recorded it to tie in with the show's first UK production. The song was written by Andrew Lloyd Webber and Jim Steinman, while Lloyd Webber, Steinman and Nigel Wright produced the track, with additional production by Franglen & Lupino. The song was also featured on the US edition of the soundtrack to the 1999 film Notting Hill, and was released to American radio on 10 May 1999.

The song became their fourth number-one on the UK Singles Chart, with its three-week stay atop the chart making it Boyzone's longest-running number-one single. It also became the band's first and only song to have any chart success in the US. Jewels & Stone did a remix for the song for dance clubs which was popular. In the UK, the song has sold 1.15 million copies and another 3 million worldwide. The song was performed by Meat Loaf as a B-side to his "Is Nothing Sacred" single in 1999.

Critical reception 
British newspaper Birmingham Evening Mail wrote, "Tina Arena has already had one hit from the Andrew Lloyd Webber/Jim Steinman stage musical 'Whistle Down The Wind' - but expect this one to do even better. As a change Stephen Gately shares lead vocals on what is essentially a simple but hugely memorable ballad. Prepare that number one spot now." A reviewer from Daily Record noted that it "shows a depth of maturity that bodes well for the future", later adding that the band "are continuing their efforts to evolve into a group which will be able to appeal to an older audience."

Music video 
A music video was made to accompany the song. It shows an African man leaving in a hot air balloon. The members of Boyzone are standing on the ground watching him depart. The African man eventually drops a small golden cross, in reference to the Christian themes of the play, "Whistle Down the Wind", from which the song originates. The video is filmed in The Roundhouse, London.

Track listings 

 UK CD1
 "No Matter What" – 4:34
 "Where Have You Been?" – 3:08
 "All That I Need" (Phil Da Costa's Oxygen edit) – 3:35

 UK CD2 and Australian CD single
 "No Matter What" – 4:34
 "She's the One" – 3:12
 "Live Interview with Boyzone" (CD ROM video)

 UK cassette single
 "No Matter What" – 4:34
 "Where Have You Been?" – 3:08

 European CD single
 "No Matter What" – 4:34
 "She's the One" – 3:12

 European maxi-CD single
 "No Matter What" (album version) – 4:34
 "Father and Son" – 2:47
 "Words" – 3:55

Credits and personnel 
Credits are lifted from the By Request album booklet.

Studios
 Recorded at Skratch Studios, Metropolis Studios, Sarm West Studios (London, England), FLM Studios (Hollywood, California), and Barking Dog Studios (New York City)

Personnel

 Andrew Lloyd Webber – music, production, executive production
 Jim Steinman – lyrics, production, executive production
 Tracy Ackerman – backing vocals (London)
 Andy Caine – backing vocals (London)
 Friðrik Karlsson – guitar (London)
 Michael Thompson – electric and acoustic guitars (Los Angeles)
 Nigel Wright – keyboards (London), production
 Lee McCutcheon – keyboard programming (London)
 Franglen & Lupino – additional production, arrangement
 Angela Lupino – bass (Los Angeles)
 Simon Franglen – keyboards, programming, engineering (Los Angeles)
 Steve Rinkoff – mixing, engineering (London)
 Mick Guzauski – mixing (Los Angeles)
 Robin Sellars – engineering (London)
 Alex Black – engineering assistant (London)
 Tom – engineering assistant (Los Angeles)

Charts

Weekly charts

Year-end charts

Certifications and sales

Release history

References 

1998 songs
1998 singles
1990s ballads
Boyzone songs
Dutch Top 40 number-one singles
Irish Singles Chart number-one singles
Island Records singles
Meat Loaf songs
Number-one singles in Denmark
Number-one singles in the Netherlands
Number-one singles in New Zealand
Number-one singles in Norway
Number-one singles in Scotland
Polydor Records singles
Song recordings produced by Jim Steinman
Song recordings produced by Andrew Lloyd Webber
Song recordings produced by Nigel Wright (record producer)
Songs from musicals
Songs with music by Andrew Lloyd Webber
Songs written by Jim Steinman
UK Singles Chart number-one singles